Eudoxis was a Canadian thrash metal band formed in Montreal, Quebec, in 1984. They released  the Metal Fix  demo and video in 1985.  The video received extensive airplay on the Canadian cable channel MuchMusic's "Power Hour."  This was followed by the 1986 EP Attack from Above and the 1991 LP Open Fire. The video for "Reach the Sun" was featured at the Los Angeles Foundations Forum in 1991 and still airs on both Much Music and Musique Plus.

They performed in spiked body armor and the drummer's kit included massive,  by  stainless steel bass drums. Eudoxis are credited as having the longest and loudest bass drums on record.

The 1991–1992 Open Fire tour featured the light show of Pierre "Metal Monk" Gendron and included songs written for their next album which was never released since Eudoxis disbanded in 1993. Deeply rooted in the philosophy of Socrates, the books of Homer, and the psychology of Freud, Sotiri Papafylis' lyrics dealt with the perils of war, torment, insanity, and triumph. Rick "Raz" Raczko explored the full potential of the bass guitar as a melodic lead instrument. This use of his custom-made graphite neck, five-string bass is exemplified on the introduction of the song "Omnipotent Phantasies" and on their instrumental epic "Reflections of a Lost Past". A new generation of Canadian metal bands regard them as musical influences and their releases have become classics treasured by fans and collectors around the world.

In 2006, Eudoxis were asked to reunite for a large Canadian heavy metal festival but this long-awaited reunion was not to be. Mars B. Alexander relocated to Toronto and formed Mars Project in 2004. Sotiri Papafylis currently sings and plays blues harmonica with Back Sabbath (a Black Sabbath tribute band).

Attack from Above 
Eudoxis' first single, was Attack from Above. Only 1000 copies of this vinyl record were pressed. This two-song EP, recorded at Lamajeure Studios, Montreal, was released in 1986, one year after their demo and video for the song "Metal Fix" which received regular airplay on MuchMusic's "Power Hour". A more polished version of "Metal Fix" appears on side 2. Side 1 features the title track "Attack from Above". Leiv Arnesen drew on his years of service in the United States Air Force as an Aircraft Armaments Systems Technician (462), in writing the title track. It was inspired by those who huddled together in fear in London's many air raid shelters during the Battle of Britain. Rick "Raz" Raczko (bass) and Stephane Rioux (drums) founded Eudoxis in 1984 and they appear on this record. Original vocalist Leiv Arnesen (Leiv Armageddon) left the band in 1987 and was replaced in 1989 by singer/songwriter Sotiri Papafylis. Ronnie Theriault (guitars) was also replaced in 1989 by ex-Axewraith guitarist Mars B. Alexander.

Open Fire 
Eudoxis' only studio album, Open Fire was recorded in Montreal at Silent Sound studio in the summer of 1990 by Graeme Scott and Morris Apelbaum. It was mixed at Karisma studio by Bryan "Rock Pig" Martin. This full-length LP was released in 1991 accompanied by the video for "Reach the Sun" (produced by David Jeidekin) and featured the songs "Tormented We Fall" and their theme song "The Gathering". The songs were written by Sotiri Papafylis (vocals), Rick "Raz" Raczko (bass), Mars B. Alexander (guitar), and J.P. Perrault (drums). Mario Gilles was recruited as a second guitar player to recreate the dual guitar parts live. The album cover illustration  is a painting by Jean-Francois Mayer. This album was released under the band's independent Shell Shock label and was distributed in Canada, Germany, Japan, Greece, and the United States. The band ceased to exist in 1993 but through the internet and collectors, this album has spread to the UK, Poland, Croatia, Russia and South America.

Members 
Members included:
Mars B. Alexander (guitars)
Mark Hill-Anderson (guitars) – 1985–1986
Leiv Arnesen (vocals) – 1985–1987
Mario Gilles (guitars)
Sotiri Papafylis (vocals)
J.P.Perrault (drums)
Rick "Raz" Raczko (bass)
Stephane Rioux (drums)- 1984–1990
Ronnie Theriault (guitars) – 1986–1989

References 

Canadian thrash metal musical groups
Musical groups established in 1984
Musical groups disestablished in 1993
Musical groups from Montreal